The men's coxless pair competition at the 1996 Summer Olympics in Atlanta, Georgia took place at  Lake Lanier, Georgia.

Competition format
This rowing event was a sweep event, meaning that each rower has one oar and rows on only one side. Two rowers crewed each boat, with no coxswain. The competition consists of multiple rounds. Finals were held to determine the placing of each boat; these finals were given letters with those nearer to the beginning of the alphabet meaning a better ranking. Semifinals were named based on which finals they fed, with each semifinal having two possible finals.

With 18 boats in with heats, the best boats qualify directly for the semi-finals. All other boats progress to the repechage round, which offers a second chance to qualify for the semi-finals. The best three boats in each of the repechage qualify for the semi-finals. The final 2 boats from each repechage go forward to final C, which determines places 13–18. The best three boats in each of the two semi-finals qualify for final A, which determines places 1–6 (including the medals). Unsuccessful boats from semi-finals A/B go forward to final B, which determines places 7–12.

Results

Heats
The first finisher of each heat advanced to the semifinals, remainder goes to the repechage.

Heat 1

Heat 2

Heat 3

Repechages
First three qualify for semifinals A/B, the rest to Final C.

Repechage 1

Repechage 2

Repechage 3

Semifinals
First three qualify to Final A, remainder to Final B.

Semifinal 1

Semifinal 2

Finals

Final C

Final B

Final A

References

Sources

Rowing at the 1996 Summer Olympics
Men's events at the 1996 Summer Olympics